Youngstown City School District is the public school system for Youngstown, Ohio.

Schools

High schools
Chaney High School
Choffin Career and Technical Center
East High School
Youngstown Rayen Early College

Intermediate school
Rayen Early College Intermediate School (co-located at Chaney High School)

Elementary schools
Harding Elementary
Kirkmere Elementary
Martin Luther King Elementary
Paul C. Bunn Elementary
Taft Elementary
Volney Rogers Elementary
William Holmes McGuffey Elementary
Williamson Elementary
Wilson Elementary

Former High Schools
Woodrow Wilson High School was shuttered at the end of the 2006–2007 school year with the opening of East High School.  The building has been demolished and will be rebuilt and reopened as a district middle school.
Rayen High School was also shuttered at the end of the 2006–2007 school year with Woodrow Wilson due to re-configuring.  The building has since been demolished. A Rayen Middle School had been scheduled to be built on the site of the former high school, but now will not be, as there is not sufficient enrollment for it.
The original building for East High School was shuttered at the end of the 1997–1998 school year due to declining enrollment.  This building has since been demolished and a new East High School opened on the same property in 2007.
South High School was shuttered at the end of the 1992–1993 school year due to declining enrollment.  This building has since been sold and is now a charter school.
North High School (known as Scienceville High School until 1945) was shuttered at the end of the 1979–1980 school year due to declining enrollment.

Uniforms
All Youngstown public schools previously mandated that students wore uniforms. However, in 2016, former district CEO Krish Mohip retracted such requirement.

References

External links

 District Website

School districts in Ohio
Education in Youngstown, Ohio